Michael Jocelyn James Paget-Wilkes (b 11 December 1941) was Archdeacon of Warwick from 1990 to 2009.

Paget-Wilkes was educated at Harper Adams Agricultural College and was an Agricultural Project manager in Tanzania from 1964 to 1966. He studied for ordination at the London College of Divinity; and was priested in 1970. After a curacy at All Saints', Wandsworth, 1969–74 he was Vicar of St James' New Cross from 1974 to 1982; and then St Matthew, Rugby until his appointment as Archdeacon. He has also written "The Church and Rural Development" (1968); "Poverty, Revolution and the Church" (1981).

References

1959 births
Living people
Alumni of Harper Adams University
Alumni of the London College of Divinity
20th-century English Anglican priests
21st-century English Anglican priests
Archdeacons of Warwick